

International records

AFC U-19 Championship 

 Champions* : Title shared 
 DNP : Did Not Participate
 DNQ : Did Not Qualify
1 No third place playoff.

AFF U19 Youth Championship

 The under-20 national team played at the 2002 to 2007 editions

Current coaching staff

Current squad
 The following players were called up for the 2022 AFF U-19 Youth Championship.
 Match dates: 2–15 July 2022
 Caps and goals correct as of: 29 June 2022
 Names in italics denote players who have been capped for the senior team.

Schedule and result

2022

Honours

Regional
 AFF U19 Youth Championship
  Winners (1): 2005
  Runners-up (1): 2002, 2018

References

External links
RSSSF Page on AFC Youth Championship

U-19
Asian national under-19 association football teams